Route 210 or Highway 210 may refer to:

Brazil
 BR-210

Canada
 Manitoba Provincial Road 210
 Newfoundland and Labrador Route 210
 Nova Scotia Route 210
 Prince Edward Island Route 210
 Quebec Route 210 
 Saskatchewan Highway 210

China
 China National Highway 210

Costa Rica
 National Route 210

Japan
 Japan National Route 210

United States
 Interstate 210
 U.S. Route 210 (former)
 Alabama State Route 210
 Arizona State Route 210
 California State Route 210
 Florida State Road 210
 Georgia State Route 210 (former)
 Iowa Highway 210
 K-210 (Kansas highway)
 Kentucky Route 210
 Maine State Route 210
 Maryland Route 210
 M-210 (Michigan highway) (former)
 Minnesota State Highway 210
 Missouri Route 210
 Montana Secondary Highway 210
 New Mexico State Road 210
 New York State Route 210
 North Carolina Highway 210
 North Dakota Highway 210
 Oregon Route 210
 Pennsylvania Route 210
 South Carolina Highway 210
 Tennessee State Route 210
 Texas State Highway 210
 Texas State Highway Loop 210
 Utah State Route 210
 Virginia State Route 210
 West Virginia Route 210
 Wyoming Highway 210